The Pongae-6, also named the  is a North Korean two-stage surface-to-air missile that was first test launched on September 30, 2021. It was noted by media to have some similarities to the Russian S-400 system, and might perform on a similar level. The system was first shown in the 75th anniversary of the Workers' Party of Korea parade, where it was possibly confused with a long-range cruise missile system. The new weapons system is likely to succeed the Pongae-5, which was similar in design to the S-300 series of anti-aircraft missiles, specifically either the S-300PMU1 or PMU2.

Design

History 
Prior to the development of the Pongae-5 system, the anti-aircraft missile systems of North Korea were largely older Soviet types, such as the S-75, S-125 and the S-200. These weapons have become dated, although the S-200 still has merits due to its long range of 300 km. The appearance of the Pongae-5 was a significant development, as it introduced a significantly more modern system, similar to the S-300. With the newer Flap Lid radar being introduced along with it, North Korean air defence started posing a much more significant threat.

The Pongae-6 system was apparently first shown on May 3, 2012 to Kim Jong-un when he visited the command headquarters of the Korean People's Army Air and Anti-Air Force, although it only became definite after the system was displayed in the 2020 75th anniversary of the WPK parade.

Transporter erector launcher 
In analysing the parade, numerous differences to the previous Pongae-5 system were noticed, such as the longer canister and the lack of hooks for crane loading on them, and there were differences on the bottom of the canister and a lack of cabling around the canisters. The transporter erector launcher also has a door on the side, which may be the entry to a command room. This has the implication that missiles may instead be controlled from the launcher, instead of a separate command vehicle. As test fired and paraded, the system is based on a two-axle TEL connected as a trailer to a three-axle truck. The truck bears a close resemblance to the M1705 truck, which pulls the THAAD system.

Missile 
The solid fuel missile used in the system is completely unlike the previous Pongae-5 system, as it is fitted with a "double-impulse flight engine", where the missile has two stages, and burns the two stages sequentially. The layout of the missile appears to be somewhat similar to the S-125 system, as that is also a two-stage missile. Nonetheless, the first stage, or booster is longer, and the control surfaces on both stages are different to the S-125 and is unique in its configuration, although overall it might be based on the mature design. However, the missile also has resemblances to the Israeli David's Sling, due to the two-stage layout while it is less advanced, as it lacks the infrared probes on it. At the "Self-defence 2021" exhibition, two missiles were displayed, one with a longer booster/first stage stage, identified by the longer cable raceway possibly as an option between range. It also allowed a closer look, where it appeared that on the second stage, there are two sets of movable fins along with a set of fixed fins. It was also mentioned that the missile had 'twin rudder control', though the meaning of this is not clear, other than that it has a set of control surfaces on both stages.

Various sources have compared the missile as being similar in capabilities to the S-400 or the THAAD, and South Korean sources speculated that the missile might have been based on reverse engineered S-400 missiles or otherwise with technology smuggled from Russia or China, but nonetheless also possible that designs of S-400 systems sold to other countries were studied by North Korean research teams. The development of the missile may hamper South Korean efforts to hamper the nuclear and strategic missile capability if war breaks out, and could 'the security balance between the two Koreas may be shaken". According to South Korean defence officials, while North Korean strategic missile defence has been rapidly improving by developing models with similarities to Russian and Chinese systems, they are not yet likely able to defeat a South Korean and US strike.

Radar 
A radar, which appeared similar to the one which participated in the test firing of the Pongae-5, was also seen in the background of the test firing on September 30, 2021. The radar appears to be fitted with a large radar behind the truck cabin, and a smaller one on top of the cabin, although it is not known if the smaller one has the ability to rotate. The Pongae-6 is reported to have a detection range of 600 km.

Operational history 
There has been one known test so far:

See also 

 S-400 missile system
 S-500 missile system
 David's Sling

References 

Surface-to-air missiles of North Korea
Military vehicles introduced in the 2020s
Missile defense
21st-century surface-to-air missiles